The 2017–18 Siena Saints men's basketball team represented Siena College during the 2017–18 NCAA Division I men's basketball season. The Saints, led by fifth-year head coach Jimmy Patsos, played their home games at the Times Union Center as members of the Metro Atlantic Athletic Conference. They finished the season 8–24 overall, 4–14 in MAAC play to finish in a tie for tenth place. As the No. 10 seed in the MAAC tournament, they lost in the first round to Quinnipiac.

On April 13, 2018, head coach Jimmy Patsos resigned amid an investigation regarding abusive conduct and financial improprieties within the program. On May 2, the Saints hired Mount St. Mary's head coach Jamion Christian for the job.

Previous season 
The Saints finished the 2016–17 season 17–17, 12–8 in MAAC play to finish in a tie for third place. They defeated Fairfield and Monmouth before losing in the championship game of the MAAC tournament to Iona.

Roster

Schedule and results

|-
!colspan=9 style=|Exhibition 

|-
!colspan=9 style=|Non-conference regular season

|-
!colspan=9 style=|MAAC regular season

|-
!colspan=9 style=| MAAC tournament

References

Siena Saints men's basketball seasons
Siena